The Hohmad (also spelled Homad) is a mountain of the Bernese Alps, located south of Blumenstein in the canton of Bern. It lies on the range north of the Simmental, approximately halfway between the Gantrisch and the Stockhorn.

References

External links
 Hohmad on Hikr

Mountains of the Alps
Mountains of Switzerland
Mountains of the canton of Bern
Two-thousanders of Switzerland